The Pit may refer to:

Places
 The Pit, a commonly used name for a mosh pit
 The Pit (arena), the main indoor arena at the University of New Mexico
 The Pit (memorial), "Яма" the Holocaust memorial in Minsk, Belarus
 Elder 'The Pit' Stadium, the football stadium at Elder High School in Cincinnati, Ohio
 McArthur Court, also called "The Pit", an arena at the University of Oregon
 Peoples Improv Theater, also referred to as "The PIT", a New York City theatre specializing in improvisational and sketch comedy
 The Pit, a 200-seat studio theatre at the Barbican Arts Centre in the City of London
 The Pit, a common nickname for the underground war room in the fortified compound of the Israeli Defense Ministry
 The Pit, a small public performance area in Harvard Square, Cambridge, Massachusetts
 The Pit, a popular study spot in the lower level of the library at the Indiana University Maurer School of Law
 The Pit, the central courtyard of the University of North Carolina at Chapel Hill

Arts, entertainment, and media

Fictional places
 The Pit (G.I. Joe), the secret headquarters of the fictional G.I. Joe in Marvel comics
 The Pit, a dangerous fighting arena featured and made famous in the Mortal Kombat video games
 The Pit, the Barksdale Organization's nickname for the low-rise building complex where D'Angelo's crew sold drugs, in The Wire

Films
 The Pit (1981 film), a Canadian horror film also known as Teddy 
 The Pit (2020 film), a Latvian drama film

Gaming
 The Pit (video game), a 1981 arcade game
 Sword of the Stars: The Pit, a 2013 space rogue computer game by Kerberos Productions

Literature
 The Pit (Judge Dredd story)
 The Pit (Norris novel), a 1903 book by Frank Norris
 The Pit (Penswick novel), a Doctor Who tie-in novel
 The Pit: A Group Encounter Defiled, a 1972 book about mind dynamics, leadership dynamics, and holiday magic
 The Pit and the Pendulum, a 1842 short horror story by Edgar Allan Poe
 Yama: The Pit, a 1905–1915 novel by Aleksandr Kuprin

Other uses in arts, entertainment, and media
 "The Pit" (song), a 2012 single by Silversun Pickups from Neck of the Woods
 "The Pit", an episode in the second season of the television series The Invaders, 1967–1968
 Orchestra pit, a lowered area in front of the stage that holds musicians who accompany the performers on stage
 A recording studio at the Sausalito location of the Record Plant

Other uses
 The Pit (mixed martial arts) training camp
 The Pit, a forum on Ultimate Guitar Archive

See also
 
 Abyss (religion), the bottomless pit, which may lead to the underworld or hell
 The Pitt, an expansion pack to the 2008 game Fallout 3
 Pit (disambiguation)